Henry Armstrong (1912–1988) was an American boxer

Henry Armstrong may also refer to:
Henry W. Armstrong (1879–1951), American boxer and composer
Henry Edward Armstrong (1848–1937), English chemist
Henry Armstrong (umpire) (died 1945), Australian cricket Test match umpire
Henry Bruce Armstrong (1844–1943), Northern Irish politician

See also
Harry Armstrong (disambiguation)